The West Yeocomico River is a  tidal river in the U.S. state of Virginia. It is an arm of the Yeocomico River, itself a branch from the Potomac River.

See also
List of rivers of Virginia

References

USGS Hydrologic Unit Map - State of Virginia (1974)

Rivers of Virginia